Louis Seigner (23 June 1903 – 20 January 1991) was a French actor.

He was born in Saint-Chef, Isère, France, the son of Louise (Monin) and Joseph Seigner, and died in Paris. He was the father of actress Françoise Seigner, with Marie Cazeaux, and the grandfather of Emmanuelle Seigner, Mathilde Seigner and Marie-Amélie Seigner.

Filmography

References

External links 
 

1903 births
1991 deaths
French male film actors
French male stage actors
Sociétaires of the Comédie-Française
People from Isère
20th-century French male actors
French National Academy of Dramatic Arts alumni
Burials at Ivry Cemetery